NBRC may refer to:

 National Board for Respiratory Care, a United States non-profit organization
 NITE Biological Resource Center, a Japanese microbiological repository